LTP may refer to:

Biology and medicine
 Lateral tibial plateau, part of a leg bone
 Lipid transfer proteins, proteins found in plant tissues
 Long-term potentiation (neurophysiology), a long-lasting enhancement in signal transmission between neurons
 'The All-Species Living Tree' Project, a project to create a phylogeny of all Bacteria and Archaea

Transportation and vehicles
 Local Tangent Plane, a geographical coordinate system commonly used in aviation
 Local transport plan, part of transport planning in England
 LTP tank, two different World War II-era tank designs:
 A Czech factory designation for Panzer 38(t)
 A Soviet light tank design by Lieutenant Provornov, never built

Technology
 Long-tailed pair, a differential pair amplifier
 Linux Test Project, a body of regression tests

Communications
 Lightweight Telephony Protocol, a signaling protocol
 Licklider Transmission Protocol, a communication protocol for use in deep space links
 Long Term Prediction, a method of sound compression and quantization in mobile communications

Other uses
 Lunar Transient Phenomena, a short-lived change in appearance of Earth's moon
 Leaning Tower of Pisa, a tower in the Italian city of Pisa
 Lullabies to Paralyze, an album by American hard rock band Queens of the Stone Age

See also

 LTPS (disambiguation)
 ITP (disambiguation)